Class E: History of America is a classification used by the Library of Congress Classification system. This article outlines the structure of Class E.

E - History of America 
1-912..........History of America
11-143..........America
11-29..........General
29............Elements in the population
31-49.2........North America
51-73..........Pre-Columbian America. The Indians
75-99..........Native Americans
81-83..........Native American wars
99..........Native American tribes and cultures
101-135..........Discovery of America and early explorations
103-110..........Pre-Columbian period
111-120..........Columbus
121-135..........Post-Columbian period. El Dorado
141-143..........Descriptive accounts of America. Earliest to 1810
151-912..........United States
151-169.12..........General
171-183.9..........History
171-180..........General
173..........Sources and documents
175-175.7..........Historiography
176-176.8..........Biography
179.5..........Historical geography
181..........Military history
182..........Naval history
183-183.3..........Political history
183.7-183.9..........Diplomatic history. Foreign and general relations.
183.8..........Relations with individual countries
184-185.98..........Elements in the population
184.5-185.98..........Afro-Americans
185.2-185.89..........Status and development since emancipation
185.96-185.98..........Biography. Genealogy
186-199..........Colonial history (1607–1775)
186-189..........General
191-199..........By period
191..........1607–1689
195-199..........1689–1775
196..........King William's War, 1689–1697
197..........Queen Anne's War, 1702–1713
198..........King George's War, 1744–1748
199..........French and Indian War, 1755–1763
201-298..........The Revolution, 1775–1783
300-453..........Revolution to the Civil War, 1775/1783–1861
300-302.6..........General
302..........Collected works of American statesmen
302.1..........Political history
302.5-302.6..........Biography (Late eighteenth century)
303-440.5..........By period
303-309..........1775–1789. The Confederation, 1783–1789
310-337..........1789–1809. Constitutional period
310.7..........Diplomatic history. Foreign and general relations
311-320..........Washington's administrations, 1789–1797
321-330..........John Adams' administration, 1797–1801
323..........Troubles with France, 1796–1800
331-337..........Jefferson's administrations, 1801–1809
333..........Purchase of Louisiana, 1803
335..........War with Tripoli, 1801–1805
336-336.5..........Neutral trade and its restrictions, 1800–1810
337.5..........Nineteenth century (General)
337.8-400..........Early nineteenth century, 1801/1809–1845
337.8-340..........General
337.8..........Collected works of American statesmen
339-340..........Biography
341-370..........Madison's administrations, 1809–1817
351.5-364.9..........War of 1812
365..........War with Algeria, 1815
371-375..........Monroe's administrations, 1817–1825
373..........Missouri Compromise, 1820
374..........Diplomatic history. Foreign relations
376-380..........John Quincy Adams' administration, 1825–1829
381-385..........Jackson's administrations, 1829–1837
384.3..........Nullification
386-390..........Van Buren's administration, 1837–1841
391-392..........William Henry Harrison's administration, March 4–April 4, 1841
396-400..........Tyler's administration, April 4, 1841–1845
398..........Northeastern boundary disputes, 1783–1845
401-415.2..........Mexican–American War, 1846–1848
408..........Mexican cessions of 1848
415.6-440.5..........Middle nineteenth century, 1845/1848–1861
415.6-415.9..........General
415.6..........Collected works of American statesmen
415.8-415.9..........Biography
416-420..........Polk's administration, 1845–1849
421-423..........Taylor's administration, 1849–July 9, 1850
423..........Slavery question, 1849–1853
426-430..........Fillmore's administration, July 9, 1850–1853
431-435..........Pierce's administration, 1853–1857
433..........Slavery question, 1853–1857
436-440.5..........Buchanan's administration, 1857–1861
438..........Slavery question, 1857–1861
440.5..........State of the country, November 1860–March 4, 1861
441-453..........Slavery in the United States. Antislavery movements
456-655..........Civil War period, 1861–1865
456-459..........Lincoln's administrations, 1861–April 15, 1865
461-655..........The Civil War, 1861–1865
482-489..........Confederate States of America
491-586..........Armies. Troops
591-600..........Naval history
660-738..........Late nineteenth century, 1865–1900
660-664..........General
660..........Collected works of American statesmen
661.7..........Diplomatic history. Foreign and general relations
663-664..........Biography
666-670..........Johnson's administration, April 15, 1865–1869
668..........Reconstruction, 1865–1877
669..........Purchase of Alaska, 1867
671-680..........Grant's administrations, 1869–1877
681-685..........Hayes' administration, 1877–1881
686-687.9..........Garfield's administration, March 4–September 19, 1881
691-695..........Arthur's administration, September 19, 1881–1885
696-700..........Cleveland's first administration, 1885–1889
701-705..........Benjamin Harrison's administration, 1889–1893
706-710..........Cleveland's second administration, 1893–1897
711-738..........McKinley's first administration, 1897–1901
713..........Annexation in 1898 of Hawaii, the Philippines, and Puerto Rico
714-735..........War of 1898 (Spanish–American War)
740-837.7..........Twentieth century
740-749..........General
740.5..........Sources and documents
742.5..........Collected works of American statesmen
743-743.5..........Political history
743.5..........Un-American activities
744-744.5..........Diplomatic history. Foreign and general relations
745..........Military history
746..........Naval history
747-748..........Biography
751..........McKinley's second administration, March 4–September 14, 1901
756-760..........Theodore Roosevelt's administrations, September 14, 1901–1909
761-765..........Taft's administration, 1909–1913
766-783..........Wilson's administrations, 1913–1921
768..........Purchase of Danish West Indies (Virgin Islands), 1917
780..........Internal history during World War I
784-805..........1919–1933. Harding-Coolidge-Hoover era. "The twenties"
785-786..........Harding's administration, 1921–August 2, 1923
791-796..........Coolidge's administration, August 2, 1923–1929
801-805..........Hoover's administration, 1929–1933
806-812..........Franklin D. Roosevelt's administrations, 1933–April 12, 1945
813-816..........Truman's administrations, April 12, 1945–1953
835-837.7..........Eisenhower's administrations, 1953–1961
838-889..........Later twentieth century, 1961–
838-840.8..........General
838.3..........Sources and documents
839.5-839.8..........Political history
839.8..........Un-American activities
840-840.2..........Diplomatic history. Foreign and general relations
840.6-840.8..........Biography (General)
841-843..........Kennedy's administration, 1961–November 22, 1963
842.9..........Assassination, funeral, memorial services, etc.
846-851..........Johnson's administrations, November 22, 1963–1969
855-861..........Nixon's administrations, 1969–August 9, 1974
860-861..........Watergate Affair. Resignation
865-868..........Ford's administration, August 9, 1974–1977
872-875..........Carter's administration, 1977–1981
876-880..........Reagan's administrations, 1981–1989
877.3..........Assassination attempt
881-884..........George H. W. Bush's administration, 1989–1993
885-889..........Clinton administration, 1993–2001
895-912..........Twenty-first century
902-904..........George W. Bush's administration, 2001–2009
907-909..........Barack Obama's administration,  2009–2017
910-912..........Donald Trump's administration, 2017-2021

References

Further reading 
 Full schedule of all LCC Classifications

E